Robert Elmer Horton (May 18, 1875 – April 22, 1945) was an American hydrologist, geomorphologist, civil engineer, and soil scientist, considered by many to be the father of modern American hydrology. An eponymous medal is awarded by the American Geophysical Union (AGU) to recognize outstanding contributions to the field of hydrological geophysics. The AGU Hydrology section (representing about a 3rd of AGU's membership) was formed largely due to his personal property (near New York) that was bequeathed to AGU.

Personal History 
Born in Parma, Michigan, he earned his B.S. from Albion College in 1897. After his graduation, he went to work for his uncle, George Rafter, a prominent civil engineer. Rafter had commissioned a weir study, the results of which Horton analyzed and summarized. In 1900, he was appointed New York District Engineer of the United States Geological Survey.

Broader Contributions in Hydrology 
During his studies of New York streams, Horton determined that the degree to which rainfall could reach the aquifer depended on a certain property of the soil, which he called infiltration capacity. He analyzed and separated the water cycle into the processes of infiltration, evaporation, interception, transpiration, overland flow, etc. Horton was the first to demarcate and label these now-familiar stages of the cycle.

Horton is well known for his study of maximum runoff and flood generation. His concept of maximum possible rainfall, limiting the effect of rainfall in specific regions, has had a major effect on meteorology. His studies of overland flow aided in the understanding of soil erosion and provided a scientific basis for soil conservation efforts. His experimental work, including conducted at the Horton Hydrological Laboratory spanned processes such as: snow melt process, river hydrodynamics, thunderstorm vortex rings, lake evaporation and wind speed experiments, among others. He combined his experimental observations with theory, and his theoretical approach was both empirical and physics based.

Having realized early in his career that the physical character of terrain played a large role in determining runoff patterns, he resolved to isolate the physical factors affecting runoff and flood discharge. He believed these to include drainage density, channel slope, overland flow length, and other less important factors. However, late in his career, he began to advocate a very different mechanism of "hydrophysical" geomorphology, which he believed better explained his prior observations.

Horton detailed his theory in a landmark paper published in 1945, only a month before his death, in the Bulletin of the Geological Society of America. He summarized his conclusions with four laws: the law of stream numbers, the law of stream lengths, the limits of infiltration capacity, and the runoff-detention-storage relation. His results demonstrate that the salient factor in aqueous soil erosion is the minimum length of overland flow necessary to produce enough runoff to affect erosion. This seminal work may be considered the founding of modern stream chemistry modeling, since it was the first comprehensive set of mathematical models to link basin hydrology with a water pollutant, namely sediment. The term Horton overland flow is named after his accomplishments in hydrology.

Unrecognized Contribution on Evaporation 
His contributions to the theory of evaporation were ignored for over 100 years, and was recently shown to have great contemporary value, for land surface models which serve as in-land boundary conditions for global climate models. His work also provides a physical basis to explain the notorious Evaporation Paradox, which has not been well understood with a physical basis, and may lead to climate deniers.

Archives of his work 
The U.S. National Archives II in College Park, Maryland hosts 94 boxes of Horton's work. Two hydrologists, Keith Beven from Lancaster University, and James Smith from Princeton University, have paid visit to the archive and reported their findings. Smaller archives of his work appear to exist in multiple places, Albion College (his alma mater) and possibly other places.

See also
 Surface runoff
 Extensions of Horton Formulas (Italian Wikipedia)

References

 Paynter, Henry M. "Robert E. Horton (1875–1945)." American Geophysical Union, Washington, DC. Accessed 2010-07-13.
 

American hydrologists
American ecologists
American soil scientists
1875 births
1945 deaths
American geophysicists
American Geophysical Union
Albion College alumni
People from Jackson County, Michigan
20th-century American geologists